Asha Mshimba Jecha (born June 26, 1962) is a Member of Parliament in the National Assembly of Tanzania. She has served in parliament since 2005. Jecha is a member of the Chama Cha Mapinduzi political party.

References

Living people
Members of the National Assembly (Tanzania)
1962 births
Place of birth missing (living people)
21st-century Tanzanian women politicians